Rafael Recto (6 November 1931 – 17 March 2008) was a Filipino former sports shooter. He competed in the 25 metre pistol event at the 1972 Summer Olympics.

References

External links
 

1931 births
2008 deaths
Filipino male sport shooters
Olympic shooters of the Philippines
Shooters at the 1972 Summer Olympics
Place of birth missing
Shooters at the 1974 Asian Games
Asian Games competitors for the Philippines
20th-century Filipino people